Imatrankoski (The Imatra Rapids) are rapids on the Vuoksi in Imatra, Finland. It has been a famous tourist attraction since the late 1700s. Imatrankoski is also one of the National landscapes of Finland. Since 1929, the rapids has been blocked by a dam as the Imatra hydroelectric plant began operation. Today, the dam is opened daily between June and August (Wednesday to Sunday, at 18:00) as well as on Christmas Day and New Year's Eve.

Geological history 
The Vuoksi and Imatrankoski were born about 5,000 BP as the waters of the Saimaa Lake penetrated the Salpausselkä end moraine due to post-glacial rebound, forming a river flowing first into the Gulf of Finland and then to Lake Ladoga.

Tourism 
Tourism in Imatrankoski is considered begun in 1772 as the Empress of Russia Catherine the Great visited the site. The Kruununpuisto Park, the oldest nature park in Finland, was established in 1842 by the Emperor Nicholas I. At the end of the 19th century, Imatrankoski was one of the best known nature attractions in Europe. The hotel Valtionhotelli was finally opened in 1903.

Gallery

References 

Rapids
Imatra
Tourist attractions in South Karelia